Natalia Willy Druyts (born 3 December 1980), known mononymously as Natalia, is a Belgian singer. She became known in Flanders during the VTM program Idool 2003, in which she finished in second place. She is currently a coach in Flemish TV-programs The Voice van Vlaanderen, The Voice Kids and The Voice Senior.

Early life and career 

Natalia was born on 3 December 1980 in Geel, Belgium. Her parents had always lived in Oevel, a village close by the Geel municipality. She graduated as a translator in English and Spanish.

Before 2003 Natalia was the singer of a small music group in Gierle (Belgium). This group was only known in the area of Turnhout (Belgium) and Westerlo (Belgium), where they had some performances. She got her breakthrough in 2003, which unfortunately meant she had to break up with her friends from 'Secret Me'.

In 2003 Natalia released her first single "Without You", the single peaked at number two in the Belgian charts and was certified gold in Belgium. Not much later, Natalia provided two songs for the Belgian movie Team Spirit II, releasing "I've Only Begun To Fight" as her second single and as part of the soundtrack for the movie. The song peaked at number one in the Belgian charts and was certified gold in Belgium. Shortly after, she recorded her first album, This Time. It was certified platinum in Belgium, and Natalia started her first tour, the This Time Live Tour. Originally planned as a 20 date tour, it was extended to 90 dates due to massive ticket demands. While on tour she performed at the pre-selections for the Eurovision Song Contest with "Higher Than The Sun", which was released as her third single. It peaked at number two in the Belgian charts. The fourth and last single of the This Time album was "I Want You Back", which peaked at number three in the charts.

In October 2005, Natalia released a single together with The Pointer Sisters, "Sisters Are Doin' It for Themselves", which reached number two in the Belgian charts. She performed 10 concerts with The Pointer Sisters in January 2006 during Natalia Meets The Pointer Sisters in the Sportpaleis, Antwerp, attended by more than 130,000 people.

Natalia released a single together with En Vogue called "Glamorous" in October 2007; it reached number two on the Belgian charts. In January 2008 she performed with En Vogue and Shaggy during Natalia Meets En Vogue, Feat Shaggy at the Sportpaleis in Antwerp.

In January 2011, Natalia planned a new concert series with an international superstar, this time she chose Anastacia. They recorded a single called "Burning Star", and in January 2011 toured as Natalia Meets Anastacia, selling over 75,000 tickets. In January 2014, Natalia was on the screen as a presenter for the first time. Together with Sam De Bruyn, she presented the Music Industry Awards on Eén. In the autumn of 2015 Natalia was a coach in the program The Voice Kids. A candidate from Natalia's team, Mentissa, eventually won the program. In 2015 she continued with her role as a coach in The Voice Kids. On 14 February 2015, Natalia was a guest at the Ladies of Soul in the Netherlands, singing the song Lady Marmalade. In August 2015, she presented her new single "Smoking Gun" during the Pop Up Live program on Eén.

Discography

Studio albums

Singles 

Notes
A.  "I Survived You", "Heartbreaker" and "Still with Me" were only released digitally.
B.  "Razorblade" did not enter the Flemish Ultratop 50, but peaked at number 5 on the Ultratip chart.
C.  "Anyone Out There" did not enter the Flemish Ultratop 50, but peaked at number 15 on the Ultratip chart.
D.  "Synchronize" did not enter the Flemish Ultratop 50, but peaked at number 12 on the Ultratip chart.
E.  "Conqueror" did not enter the Flemish Ultratop 50, but peaked at number 16 on the Ultratip chart.
F.  "Hear That Sound" did not enter the Flemish Ultratop 50, but peaked at number 2 on the Ultratip chart.

DVDs 
 Back For More live (2005) (#1)
 Natalia Meets En Vogue feat. Shaggy (2008)
 Natalia Live in Hasselt – 10 Year Anniversary Concert (2013)

Awards

Autobiography 
Met Hart En Soul (English: With Heart and Soul) was written by Natalia and a ghost-writer.
It is about her early life and career. The book was released on 8 October 2007.

References

External links 

Official sites:
NataliaDruyts.be
NataliaMusic.be
NataliaMusic.nl
Natalia at My Space

Official site for Natalia Meets Anastacia
Nataliameets.be

1980 births
Living people
People from Geel
21st-century Belgian women singers
21st-century Belgian singers
Idols (franchise) participants
English-language singers from Belgium